This is an incomplete list of ghost towns in North Carolina.

 Brunswick Town (former state capital)
 Buffalo City
 Cape Lookout Village
 Cataloochee
 Ceramic
 Diamond City
 Fort Dobbs (frontier fort during the French and Indian war)
 Glenville (town submerged by Lake Glenville, some residents relocated to the eastern edge of the lake)
 Henry River Mill Village
 Judson (submerged under Lake Fontana)
 Lost Cove
 Mortimer
 Portsmouth
 Proctor (isolated by Lake Fontana and abandoned)
 Roanoke Colony
 Ruby City (mining town once located near Willets in Jackson County, now the site of the Balsam Mountain Preserve)
 Whitney (partially submerged by Badin Lake)

References

 
North Carolina
Ghost towns